Mailhot is a surname. Notable people with it include:

 Brian Mailhot (born 1975), American professional wrestler
 Jeffrey Mailhot (born 1970), American serial killer
 René Mailhot (1942–2007), Canadian journalist
 Terese Marie Mailhot, First Nation Canadian writer, journalist, memoirist, and teacher

See also
 Hotmail